Nam Dong-Hong (also Nam Dong-Hun, ; born May 1, 1984 in Daegu) is a South Korean modern pentathlete. He is also a silver medalist at the 2008 Korean Open & Asian Championships in Seoul, and is currently ranked no. 123 in the world by the Union Internationale de Pentathlon Moderne (UIPM).

Nam qualified for the 2008 Summer Olympics in Beijing, where he competed in the men's modern pentathlon, along with his teammate Lee Choon-Huan. During the competition, Nam struggled in the early segments, with poor scores in pistol shooting and a one-touch épée fencing. He managed to attain a sixteenth-place finish in freestyle swimming, but displayed a weak performance in the riding segment, when he completed the show jumping course in thirtieth place, and incurred a total of 380 penalties (both obstacle and time). In the cross-country running segment, Nam finished the 3 km race, with a fastest time and an Olympic record of 8:55.57. Nam's best result in the last round, however, was insufficiently enough to reach the top position, finishing only in twenty-eighth place with a score of 4,968 points.

References

External links
UIPM Profile
NBC 2008 Olympics profile

South Korean male modern pentathletes
1984 births
Living people
Olympic modern pentathletes of South Korea
Modern pentathletes at the 2008 Summer Olympics
Sportspeople from Daegu
South Korean Buddhists